The Brazilian states football championships are the professional adult male soccer competitions in Brazil that take place between January and April for the Northeast, Central-West, Southeast and South regions. In some states from the North Region, however, it takes place in May or June. Historically, for economic and geographic reasons, such as long distances between the country's main cities, the state leagues were considered the most important championship for Brazilian clubs, especially before 1959, when a regular national championship (Taça Brasil) was first established. In recent years, bigger clubs have become increasingly critical of the state leagues, which are often blamed for the lack of space in Brazil's football calendar and have lost most of its old prestige. Smaller clubs, however, are dependant on the state leagues for their financial well-being and largely oppose calls to reduce the number of games or even end state leagues altogether. 

Because of these championships, some disputes between rivals from the same state or city have the same weight or greater than a dispute with the main clubs in other states.  These games are called derbies.  Some examples are the Fla-Flu and the Clássico dos Milhões, in Rio de Janeiro; Paulista Derby, Choque Rei, Majestoso and San-São, in São Paulo; Gre-nal, in Rio Grande do Sul; the Clássico Mineiro, in Minas Gerais; Atle-tiba, in Paraná; the Clássico dos Clássicos and Clássico das Multidões, in Pernambuco; the Ba-Vi, in Bahia; the Clássico de Florianópolis and the Clássico do Interior, in Santa Catarina; Clássico-Rei, in Ceará, between Ceará and Fortaleza, and in Rio Grande do Norte between ABC and América de Natal; the Re-Pa, in Pará; Clássico das Multidões in Alagoas; the Super Clássico, in Maranhão; Rivengo, in Piauí; the Clássico dos Maiorais, in Paraíba; Derby Sergipano, in Sergipe; the Derby do Cerrado, in Goiás; the Rio-Nal, in Amazonas; the Clássico dos Gigantes, in Espírito Santo; between others.

State champions and runners-up, and in some states, the highest placed on the state championship table, are automatically qualified to play in the next year's Copa do Brasil. In addition, the highest ranked clubs in each state that do not compete in the Brazilian Championship Serie A, Serie B or Serie C qualify for next year's Serie D. Finally, the best teams in each state league can also qualify for regional cups such as the Copa do Nordeste (for Northeastern clubs) and Copa Verde (for clubs from North and Center-West regions). To prepare for the State Championship, divisionless clubs, lacking a full-year calendar, play training games and some choose to face Municipal Selections in different regions.

The only state championship that does not use the official gentile of those born in the state is the one in Rio de Janeiro, since, popularly, the tournament is called Campeonato Carioca (Carioca is the official gentile of the municipality of Rio de Janeiro), instead of Campeonato Fluminense.  This occurs for three reasons: the first because of tradition, since the big clubs in the state, when Rio de Janeiro was still the capital of Brazil, disputed the Campeonato Carioca and not the Campeonato Fluminense; the second because popular and culturally Carioca is the gentile by which its inhabitants are usually known outside the state of Rio de Janeiro, and the third because there is a traditional club in the state called Fluminense, which could generate complaints from rivals if the championship were so called.  Because of this, the Rio state football championship is officially called the Campeonato Estadual do Rio de Janeiro

The club with the most state champions in Brazil is ABC, with 57 titles from Campeonato Potiguar, which gives it the world record for the most titles in the same competition.  This team also holds the record for straight titles, ten (between 1932 and 1941), alongside América Mineiro (which won the Campeonato Mineiro successively between 1916 and 1925).  Bahia is the second biggest champion and Paysandu, the third.

The players most often champions are the left midfielder Quarentinha, with 12 titles, all for Paysandu, between the 1950s and the 1970s, being the one with the most triumphs in a single state and by the same club; defender Durval, who in 2017 also won his 12th state title, in 5 FUs (each for a single team), among trophies accumulated since 2003 between the Campeonato Paraibano, Brasiliense, Paranaense, Pernambucano (6) and Paulista (3) championships; the midfielder Givanildo Oliveira, winner of 10 Pernambucanos, as well as a Paulista and a Carioca; and Jorge Henrique, who is perhaps the player who won in more states, as he was champion 12 times by 8 teams in 8 FUs (CE, DF, PE (3), PR, RJ, RS (2), SC and SP (2).  As a coach, the same Givanildo won 18 state teams for 10 teams in 6 FUs, an absolute record: 7 Paraenses, 5 Pernambucanos, 2 Cearenses, 2 Alagoanos, 1 Baiano and 1 Mineiro.  This adds up to 30 state commemorations for Givanildo, an isolated record holder.  Another big winner is Vanderlei Luxemburgo, who won 14 times for 9 teams in 5 FUs (9 Paulistas, 2 Mineiros, 1 Carioca, 1 Capixaba and 1 Pernambucano) as a coach (already having three achievements as a player: 3 Cariocas), having nine titles this century, being tied at the top of this stat with Givanildo, who in turn is also the statewide winner for more different teams in the 21st century (8).

List of state football leagues in Brazil

Unrelegated football clubs

Notes

Some clubs were licensed, but due to the absence of lower divisions, they were never relegated.
Some clubs like Vasco da Gama have disputed the second level before been promoted for the first time.
Some state leagues do not have enough data to determine the consecutive sequence of club participations.
Until the 50s, the Campeonato Gaúcho brought together the champions of each region of Rio Grande do Sul. Grêmio and Internacional disputed the Municipal Championship of Porto Alegre before to decide who would advance to the final stage.
Due to the 2002 Torneio Rio-São Paulo, Corinthians, Palmeiras, Santos and São Paulo did not compete in the regular edition of Campeonato Paulista. After the end of Rio-São Paulo, Corinthians, São Paulo and Palmeiras qualified, alongside Ituano to the dispute of the Supercampeonato Paulista. Santos, since it did not qualify for the Supercampeonato Paulista, had its series of participations interrupted.
As the Campeonato Roraima does not have a second level, in practice no club has been relegated yet, however Atlético Roraima is the only team that has played in all editions of the professional era.

Source: RSSSF Brasil

See also

Brazilian football league system

References